João Paulo Sales de Souza (born 18 March 1988), known as João Paulo, is a Brazilian footballer who plays as forward for Thai League 2 club Suphanburi.

Career statistics

Honours

Club
 Lamphun Warrior
 Thai League 3: 2020–21

References

External links

1988 births
Living people
Brazilian footballers
Association football forwards
Fernandópolis Futebol Clube players
América Futebol Clube (SP) players
Marília Atlético Clube players
Cianorte Futebol Clube players
Operário Ferroviário Esporte Clube players
Clube Náutico Marcílio Dias players
Mixto Esporte Clube players
Olímpia Futebol Clube players
Esporte Clube Democrata players
Boa Esporte Clube players
Tombense Futebol Clube players
River Atlético Clube players
Rio Claro Futebol Clube players
Esporte Clube São Bento players
Club Blooming players
Viettel FC players
Joao Paulo
Joao Paulo
Joao Paulo
Campeonato Brasileiro Série B players
Campeonato Brasileiro Série C players
Campeonato Brasileiro Série D players
Campeonato Paranaense players
Bolivian Primera División players
V.League 1 players
Joao Paulo
Brazilian expatriate footballers
Brazilian expatriate sportspeople in Bolivia
Brazilian expatriate sportspeople in Vietnam
Brazilian expatriate sportspeople in Thailand
Expatriate footballers in Thailand
Expatriate footballers in Vietnam
Expatriate footballers in Bolivia
People from Fernandópolis
Footballers from São Paulo (state)